Margit Kristian (27 June 1913 – 20 January 2008) was a Yugoslav fencer. She competed in the women's individual foil event at the 1936 Summer Olympics.

References

External links
 

1913 births
2008 deaths
Yugoslav female foil fencers
Olympic fencers of Yugoslavia
Fencers at the 1936 Summer Olympics
Sportspeople from Zrenjanin